Scottish Labour Students (SLS) is a student society affiliated to Scottish Labour, and part of the UK wide organisation Labour Students.

It aims to bring Labour values to campuses and represent students within the Labour Party throughout Scotland. SLS hold regular Scottish events including SLS Conference in November and SLS Council in February. In addition, its members are often invited to hear major speakers at Labour Party events throughout the year. Glasgow University Labour Club and Edinburgh Labour Students are the two biggest clubs within SLS. The newest club within SLS is The University of the West of Scotland Labour Students.

History 

The organisation was founded as the  Organisation of Labour Students (SOLS) in 1970/71, however it is a direct descendant of the Scottish Association of Labour Student Organisations (SALSO) which had existed since 1946. In the 1960s SALSO's UK equivalent, the National Association of Labour Student Organisations (NALSO), was taken over by Trotskyists and disaffiliated from the Labour Party. SALSO, however, successfully resisted any take-over attempts.

SOLS remained famous for its hostility to Trotskyism and its members were key to recovering control of the National Organisation of Labour Students, NOLS, from the Militant tendency in 1975 and the following year SOLS members took the famous "icepick express" (a bus with an icepick - the weapon used to kill Leon Trotsky - attached to the front) to that year's NOLS conference at Lancaster University. This incident is recalled in some detail in Michael Crick's book on the Militant tendency. (see Clause Four Group.)  Those who were involved included Bill Speirs, Ian Davidson and Dave Smith (NOLS chair).

In 2023, Scottish Conference voted unanimously to re-affiliated SLS after a dedicated campaign by incumbent Chair Solomon Cuthbertson.

Internal organisation 

SLS is made up of affiliated Labour Clubs at universities across Scotland.

SLS has an executive committee, elected on a yearly basis, currently including:

 Chair: Solomon Cuthbertson
 Vice Chair: Debbie Boyd 
 Secretary: Jamie McGuire 
 Treasurer: Lucy Penman (Co-Opted Mid-Term)
 Social Media and Communications: Daniel Cameron 
 Women's Officer: Lauren Harper
 Disabled Students' Officer: Elspeth Oakley 
 BAME Officer: Bibi-Anne Latief-Shinki
 LGBT+ Officer: VACANT 
 Student Union Liaison: Lucy Penman

All positions are elected at the annual SLS Conference held at the conclusion of each academic year.

Liberation groups 

The SLS committee includes representatives from each of the 4 liberation campaigns recognised by Labour Students: Women's, LGBT+, Disabled Students and Black Minority Ethnic. Each campaign is autonomous and hold events and discussions designed at highlighting issues relevant to them to the wider Labour Students movement.

Campaigning 

SLS members are involved in election campaigning in Scotland and across the UK, and the organisation mobilises its members to take part in campaigns in marginal seats across the country.

In addition to this, for the first time in 2007/08 SLS ran its own issue-based priority campaign. 'Changing Perceptions - Homelessness' intended to challenge the perception young people have of the homeless in Scotland.

In 2008 SLS ran a Pro Choice Lobbying Campaign against attempts during the passage of the Human Fertilisation and Embryology Bill by Conservative Party MP Nadine Dorries to reduce the upper limit for abortions to 20 weeks from the current 24 weeks of pregnancy. Her amendment was defeated by 332 votes to 190, with a separate 22-week limit opposed by 304 votes to 233 - with MPs continuing to support the 24-week limit.

SLS are also actively involved in opposing the Scottish National Party plans to introduce a Local Income Tax which SLS claim would hit students who have to work to support themselves while studying.

As of 2014 SLS officially supports the return of the post-study work visa and free education.

The SLS priority campaign for 2019/20 is the unionisation of workers in student unions across Scotland.

List of Chairs 

1967: Robin Cook 
1976: Robin Wales 
1978: David Smith 
1979: Margaret Curran 
1980: John Boothman 
1981: Geoff Norris 
1982: Paul Robertson
1984: Sarah Boyack 
1985: Susan Deacon
1986: Pat McFadden
1987: Paul Greatrix
1988: Billy Halliday
1992: Jason Wassell 
1994: Joanne Milligan 
1997: Gregg McClymont 
1998: Alex Foulkes 
2001: Blair McDougall 
2002: Blair McDougall* 
2002: Gemma Doyle & John Woodcock
2003: Adam Hug 
2004: Neil Bibby 
2005: Kenny Young 
2006: Kenny Young 
2007: Victoria Jamieson 
2008: Jillian Merchant 
2009: Dean Carlin 
2010: Ross MacRae 
2011: Ross MacRae 
2011: Mary Roberts 
2012: Lewis Miller 
2013: Stephen Donnelly 
2014: Oliver Milne 
2015: Erin Mulhatton 
2016: Pippa Weaver 
2017: Kate Shaw Nelson 
2018: Kirsten Muat 
2019: Andrew Wilson (resigned mid-term after majority of University Labour Clubs voted no confidence in leadership) 
2019: Mariam Shaaban (elected following Andrew Wilson's resignation) 
2020: Mariam Shaaban (resigned mid-term) 
2020: Lottie Doherty (Interim Chair) 
2021: Daniel Deery 
2022: Solomon Cuthbertson 

Note: Blair McDougall served two terms because the Youth and Student Conference was cancelled following the death of Scotland's First Minister, Donald Dewar.

External links
 Edinburgh Labour Students
 Glasgow University Labour Club

Scottish Labour
1946 establishments in Scotland
1970 establishments in Scotland
1970 in British politics
Student organizations established in 1946
Labour
Student wings of social democratic parties